Mandawa is a town, just 29 km from Jhunjhunu city in Jhunjhunu district of Rajasthan, India. It is part of Shekhawati region. It has an average elevation of 316 metres (1036 ft). The nearest railway station is Jhunjhunu railway station.

History

The town of Mandawa was  a thikana of Jaipur State. Mandawa once functioned as a trading outpost for ancient caravan routes in Shekhawati for goods from China and the Middle East. Thakur Nawal Singh, then ruler of Nawalgarh and Mandawa built a fort in to protect this outpost. Over time, a township grew around the fort and soon attracted a large community of traders, who then settled down at Mandawa. The great Ghazal Singer of South Asia Mehdi Hassan was born here and migrated to Pakistan after the partition of India.

About Mandawa 

The lovely town of Mandawa is known as the "Open Art Gallery" as a whole. During the 18th century, Mandawa was a key stop for wealthy merchants travelling the Silk Road. The majority of them chose to build their homes in this town, resulting in the creation of a plethora of exquisitely crafted large Havelis that are popular tourist attractions in Mandawa. Many Bollywood films like PK (film), Bajrangi Bhaijaan, Ae Dil Hai Mushkil among others are shot here.

Places of Interest 

Mandawa is world-famous for its havleis, wall paintings and frescos. Its historical sites and rich culture entice visitors.
Mandawa Fort
Mandawa Haveli
Murmuria Haveli
Gulab Rai Ladia Haveli

Demographics
 India census, Mandawa had a population of 23,335. Males constitute 51% of the population and females 49%. Mandawa has an average literacy rate of 58%, lower than the national average of 59.5%: male literacy is 70%, and female literacy is 45%. In Mandawa, 18% of the population is under 6 years of age.

See also
Shekhawati
Holi Festival
Kalwas

References

Cities and towns in Jhunjhunu district